The R-7 Semyorka, officially the GRAU index 8K71, was a Soviet missile developed during the Cold War, and the world's first intercontinental ballistic missile. The R-7 made 28 launches between 1957 and 1961, but was never deployed operationally. A derivative, the R-7A, was deployed from 1959 to 1968. To the West it was unknown until its launch (later it would get the NATO reporting name SS-6 Sapwood). In modified form, it launched Sputnik 1, the first artificial satellite, into orbit, and became the basis for the R-7 family which includes Sputnik, Luna, Molniya, Vostok, and Voskhod space launchers, as well as later Soyuz variants.

The widely used nickname for the R-7 launcher, "Semyorka", means "digit 7" in Russian.

Description

A single thermonuclear warhead was carried with a nominal yield of 3 megatons of TNT. The initial launch was boosted by four strap-on liquid rocket boosters making up the first stage, with a central 'sustainer' engine powering through both the first and the second stage. Each strap-on booster included two vernier thrusters and the core stage included four. The guidance system was inertial with radio control of the vernier thrusters.

Development

 
Following first ground tests in late 1953 the initial design was heavily reworked and the final design was not approved until May 1954 and Korolev reportedly reviewed more than 100 design proposals. In 1954, the draft project was completed. For the first time the development of the project was created a separate volume dedicated to the testing of missile technology. This volume was developed under the leadership of Arcady Ilyich Ostashev. Instead of using jet vanes for control, which increased resistance generated at the engine nozzle exhaust outlet, the R-7 used special control engines. These same engines served as the last stage's vernier thrusters.

Because of clustered design, each booster had its own propellant tanks. The design team had to develop a system to regulate the propellant component consumption ratio and to synchronize the consumption between the boosters.

Starting from the R-1, which was a copy of the German V-2, a free-standing missile was launched from a horizontal pad. It turned out that assembling a cluster of a central core and four boosters on the pad is almost impossible without it falling apart. Also, a wind gust could knock the missile off of the pad. The solution was to eliminate the pad and to suspend the entire rocket in the trusses that bear both vertical weight load as well as horizontal wind forces. The launch system simulated flight conditions with strap-on boosters pushing the central core forward.

The R-7 rocket was another Soviet attempt to build a successful rocket to get to space. The rocket had some key features to it that made it unique. One of the main features to the rocket were the many different engines that were utilized for propulsion. Of the four strap on propulsion engines, they were all powered by the RD-107 engine. Vernier engines were utilized for steering, and the R-7 contained four of them. Powering the vernier capabilities for the rocket was the RD-108 engine.

The new missile's GRAU index was 8K71. The first flight-ready vehicle was delivered to the Baikonur Cosmodrome on 1 May 1957, and flown on 15 May. A fire broke out in the Blok D strap-on almost immediately at liftoff. It broke away from the booster at T+88 seconds, which crashed 400 km (248 miles) downrange. The next attempt on 11 June (the same day the United States conducted its first test launch of an ICBM), an electrical short caused the missile to start rolling uncontrollably and disintegrate 33 seconds after liftoff. The dummy warhead impacted in the Pacific Ocean and five days later, TASS announced that the Soviet Union had "successfully tested a multi-stage intercontinental ballistic missile". A modified version of the missile (8K71PS) placed Sputnik 1 in orbit from Baikonur on 4 October 1957 and Sputnik 2 on 3 November 1957.

The next ICBM test took place on 30 January 1958, but the strap-ons failed to separate cleanly and damaged plumbing in the core stage, which lost thrust and impacted far off target. These early flights revealed assorted design flaws in the R-7 which necessitated multiple modifications to the missile. Testing continued into December 1959, and the last original 8K71 flew on 27 February 1961. Aside from the initial Sputnik launches, the 8K71 formed the basis of the 8K72 booster used for the first generation Luna probes. Six out of nine Luna probes launched on the 8K72 failed. Combined with the failed Sputnik launch on 27 April 1958, this brought the booster's total space launch record to 6 successes in 13 attempts. The improved 8K74 formed the basis for the later Vostok and Molniya boosters, greatly increasing reliability.

Operational history 
The first strategic-missile unit became operational on 9 February 1959 at Plesetsk in the north-west of the USSR. On 15 December 1959 the R-7 missile was tested at Plesetsk for the first time. The missiles were fully deployed by 1962.

Total service was limited to no more than ten nuclear-armed missiles active at any time.  A single launch pad was operational at Baikonur and from six to eight were in operation at Plesetsk.

The costs of the system were high, mostly due to the difficulty of constructing in remote areas the large launch sites required.

Besides the cost, the missile system faced other operational challenges.  With the U-2 overflights, the huge R-7 launch complexes could not be hidden and therefore could be expected to be destroyed quickly in any nuclear war.  Also, the R-7 took almost twenty hours to prepare for launching, and it could not be left on alert for more than a day due to its cryogenic fuel system.  Therefore, the Soviet force could not be kept on permanent alert and could have been subject to an air strike before launching. Additionally, the huge payload for which it was designed, adapted to early heavy H-bombs, became irrelevant with the coming of lighter bomb technology.

The limitations of the R-7 pushed the Soviet Union into rapidly developing second-generation missiles which would be more viable weapons systems. The R-7 was phased out of military service by 1968.

While the R-7 turned out to be impractical as a weapon, it became the basis for a series of Soviet expendable space launch vehicles, the Soyuz family of launchers. As of 2018, in modified versions (Soyuz-U, Soyuz-FG, and the Soyuz-2 (including the boosterless 2.1v variant), the vehicle is still in service, having launched over 1840 times.

Variants

SS-6 Sapwood NATO reporting name for all versions of the R-7, variants identified by suffix letter on the name portion (e.g. Sapwood-A).
R-7 Semyorka First launch 15 May 1957, last launch 27 February 1961; 27 launch attempts, 18 of which were successful.
R-7A Semyorka First launch 23 December 1959, last launch 25 July 1967; 21 launch attempts, 18 of which were successful.
8K71The GRAU designation for the R-7 Semyorka missile (GRAU 8K: Missiles 71: model number)
8K74The GRAU designation for the R-7A Semyorka missile (GRAU 8K: Missiles 74: model number)
8K71PS Sputnik 1 launcher

Note: Some variants of the R-7 are still used:
Soyuz-2.1a	(14A14A)
Soyuz-2.1b	(14A14B)

Operators
 The Strategic Missile Troops was the only operator of the Semyorka.

See also
R-7 space launchers
List of missiles
Timeline of Russian innovation

References

 The Kremlin's Nuclear Sword, Steven J. Zaloga, Smithsonian Institution Press, Washington and London, 2002.

External links
Rocket R-7  from S.P. Korolev Rocket and Space Corporation Energia, a Russian rocket and space contractor
The R-7 Missile, history of its development
Socio-educational portal «Workers of the cosmos»
 "I look back and have no regrets. " - Author: Abramov, Anatoly Petrovich: publisher "New format" Barnaul, 2022. 

Cold War intercontinental ballistic missiles of the Soviet Union
Novaya Zemlya
Sputnik
Soviet inventions
R-7 (rocket family)
R-007
Military equipment introduced in the 1950s